Everybody Knows is the seventh studio album by post-industrial band The Young Gods.

Track listing
All music written and performed by The Young Gods.
 "Sirius Business" - 0:42
 "Blooming" - 4:48
 "No Land's Man" - 5:01
 "Mister Sunshine" - 7:03
 "Miles Away" - 9:58
 "Two to Tango" - 3:35
 "Introducing" - 3:53
 "Tenter le Grillage" - 4:51
 "Aux Anges" - 2:21
 "Once Again" - 8:08

References

External links 
 

The Young Gods albums
2010 albums
Albums produced by Roli Mosimann
Albums produced by Franz Treichler